Lunawada is one of the 182 Legislative Assembly constituencies of Gujarat state in India. It is part of Mahisagar district.

List of segments
This assembly seat represents the following segments,

 Lunawada Taluka – Entire taluka except villages – Kel, Dezar, Vaghoi, Chuladiya, Jetharibor, Gugaliya, Simlet.
 Khanpur Taluka

Members of Legislative Assembly
2007 - Hirabhai Haribhai Patel, Indian National Congress
2012 - Hirabhai Haribhai Patel, Indian National Congress

Election results

2022

2019 Bypoll

2017

2012

See also
 List of constituencies of Gujarat Legislative Assembly
 Gujarat Legislative Assembly

References

External links
 

Assembly constituencies of Gujarat
Mahisagar district